Grent Refik Halili (born 24 May 1998 in Tiranë) is an Albanian former professional footballer who played as a forward. Throughout his career he has played for Tirana and he is the son of Tirana's owner and president Refik Halili.

Club career

Early career
Halili started his youth career at KF Tirana in 2011.

In May 2013 he went on trial at Italian club Varese alongside fellow KF Tirana youth player Marko Çema as part of a collaboration between the two clubs.

Tirana 
Halili was promoted to the senior team at KF Tirana by coach Gugash Magani during the 2014–15 season where he made his professional debut in the Albanian Cup against Sopoti Librazhd, where he also scored his first goal. He signed a four–year contract with KF Tirana along with fellow youth player David Domgjoni on 1 April 2015, keeping him at the club until 2019.

Halili scored his first league goal for Tirana on 18 November 2017 in the matchday 8 of the 2017–18 Albanian First Division against Apolonia Fier and Tirana took a 2–0 victory.

He sacked the coaches Egbo and Dede for not including him at the starting 11.
Halili's nickname is Gaucho Junior, due to similarities with Brazilian legend Ronaldinho.

International career

Albania U19 
Halili was called up at Albania national under-19 football team by coach Arjan Bellaj at the pre-eleminary squad for the 2017 UEFA European Under-19 Championship qualification from 6-11 October 2016.

Albania U21 
Halili was called up at the Albania national under-21 football team by coach Alban Bushi for a double Friendly match against Moldova U21 on 25 & 27 March 2017.

2019 UEFA European Under-21 Championship qualification
Halili was called up for the Friendly match against France U21 on 5 June 2017 and the 2019 UEFA European Under-21 Championship qualification opening match against Estonia U21 on 12 June 2017. He was not part of the 18-man squad which featured in the opening match of the qualifiers on 12 June against Estonia U21.

Career statistics

Club

Personal life
His father Refik Halili is owner of the club where he plays KF Tirana.

Honours

Club
Tirana
 Albanian Superliga: 2019–20
 Albanian Cup: 2016–17
 Albanian Supercup: 2017
 Albanian First Division : Winner Group B
 Albanian First Division : 2017-2018

References

External links

Grent Halili at the Albanian Football Association

1998 births
Living people
Footballers from Tirana
Albanian footballers
Albania youth international footballers
Albania under-21 international footballers
Association football forwards
Kategoria e Dytë players
Kategoria e Parë players
Kategoria Superiore players
KF Tirana players